Göpfersdorf is a municipality in the district of Altenburger Land, in Thuringia, Germany. Göpfersdorf consists of two districts (Garbisdorf, Göpfersdorf).

References

Altenburger Land
Duchy of Saxe-Altenburg